The lanes and alleyways of Sydney are a series of passageways found in Sydney central business district that have historically functioned by providing both off-street vehicular access to city buildings and secondary pedestrian routes through city blocks. They generally feature street art, cafes, restaurants, bars and retail outlets. The Rocks has the most prominent and historical laneways in Sydney, which date to the 19th century. Forgotten Songs is a popular attraction found in Angel Place.

The bulk of the laneways are found at George Street and Pitt Street. Chinatown also features a number of lanes, alleys and arcades. There are around 107 individual lanes in Sydney CBD, where they are demarcated by four precincts; Northern CBD, Central CBD, Western CBD and Southern CBD.

History

Unlike the controlled grid pattern of planned cities such as Melbourne and Adelaide, the lanes of Sydney developed as a consequence to commercial objectives and antecedent circulation patterns. Therefore, it can be assumed that all lanes have a level of importance in the city. The evolution of the lanes can be traced from 1854 to the present day. By the year 1912, the CBD had accomplished an urban shape which stayed comparatively unvarying through to about 1948. By that year, a complex and indeterminable network of small streets and lanes were evident. By 1969, the pattern of site integration and the deconstruction of lanes had begun with the establishment of Australia Square, AMP and Gold Fields House. 

Heritage buildings found on several lanes echo the industrial past of many of the lanes such Central Street, Albion Street and Bulletin Place. Bulletin Place and Abercrombie Lane were trendy spots for restaurants. Picture records show that Rowe Street had a long history as a retail area. The practice of Council selling lanes dates from the early 20th century. From the 1960s through to the late 1980s, over twenty-five sales of lanes or parts of lanes were transacted by Council, totaling a sum of 57 million dollars. This resulted in the loss of unique retail areas such as Rowe Street and Angel Place, and as well as loss of context for heritage buildings such as those found in Bulletin Place, Central Street and Albion Street.

Revitalisation
On February 24, 1992, the council imposed a postponement on the sale of lanes due to their heritage significance. From the early 1990s, a number of lanes around Circular Quay, Martin Place and Australia Square began redevelopment. 

In June 2009, City of Sydney Council picked eight CBD laneways for public domain improvements, where they later included a ninth laneway. These were, Bulletin Place, Angel Place, Hosking and Penfold Place, Lees Court, Ash Street, York Lane, Albion Place, Central Street, and Wilmot Street. Between 2010 and 2016, redevelopments were completed in those lanes, with most of these precincts gaining new businesses and increased economic vibrancy. 

More than 10 lanes began revitalisation starting from 2021, with the City of Sydney announcing a plan to modify laneways throughout the CBD by establishing new pedestrian walkways and art installations as part of the revivification proposal that will last a decade. This would include more fresco style dining and increased pedestrian access from George Street. Around 25 lanes were upgraded with the installation of bars, restaurants, retail outlets and art installations by the City of Sydney in a span of 15 years, beginning from 2007. In 2021-22, upgrading had took place in Barlow Street, St Laurence Lane, Curtin Place, Hamilton Street, Little Hunter Street, Randle Lane, York Lane, Wynyard Lane, Underwood Street and Dalley Street.

Significant lanes

Abercrombie Lane forms a portion of formerly vital pedestrian network delimited by George, Bridge and Pitt Streets, where it connects through NZI House to Bond Street and Australia Square, and provides the possibility to recapture a pedestrian district with a specific scale and quality in the CBD. The lane has a long history as part of Sydney's pedestrian network, where it makes an appearance on William Well's 1850 map of Sydney.  

Wynyard Lane allows vehicle access to structures on George and Carrington Streets. Manning Lane goes through Bridge and Dalley Street, where it provides a shortcut through the building midway between George and Pitt Street. Phillip Lane allows vehicle entry to buildings on Phillip Street and Macquarie Street. Sussex Lane is parallel to Kent Street and is characterised by several terraced stores, in addition to featuring Waterside Workers' Federation Building, a heritage listed edifice. York Lane is a crucial laneway that provides access to heritage building sites and as well as access for vehicles and pedestrians. James Lane represents a number of 19th century industrial-style buildings, and it still maintains its original form. Rawson Lane near Pitt Street features heritage buildings and a view of the clock tower at the Central railway station.  

Ash Street was developed in 1886 where it featured luxurious 19th and early 20th century structures.  Palings Lane is described by the Local Environmental Plans as a "rare example of a pedestrian route created when the north-south street grid was formed in early Victorian Sydney". Market Row features heritage-listed buildings and is defined by its significant architecture. Douglas Lane is surrounded by George, Liverpool, Sussex and Goulburn Streets and was a crucial lane for the city in the industrial age. Kimber Lane is situated in Chinatown where it is perpendicular to Dixon Street and is of cultural significance. De Maistre Place features the Watson House and has pedestrian routes from Pitt and Hunter Street to Wynyard station.  

Some lanes such as those within Rowe Street provide an advantageous secondary path, allowing pedestrians the choice of averting crowded and noisy city streets. Lanes such as Tankstream Way are important heritage items identified and others listed in conservation areas are conducive elements, intrinsic to the quality and character of those areas. Angel Place is part of a unique pedestrian precinct that was once enhanced by retail stores at ground floor. Dalley Street is pivotal for pedestrian and vehicular access and also for access to heritage buildings.

List
Lanes, alleyways and arcades in the city include:

 Bakehouse Place
 Surgeons Court
 Mill Lane
 Suez Canal
 Deans Place
 Temperance Lane
 Carahers Lane
 St Laurence Lane
 Maori Lane
 McElhone Place
 Atchison Lane
 Longs Lane
 Greenway Lane
 Nurses Walk
 Cribbs Lane
 Kendall Lane
 Angel Place
 Ash Street
 Crown Lane
 Cammeraygal Place
 May Lane 
 Caroline Lane
 Kimber Lane 
 Palings Lane
 Tank Stream Way 
 Penfold Lane 
 Randle Lane 
 York Lane
 Mary’s Place
 Llankelly Place
 Skittle Lane
 Strand Arcade
 Wynyard Lane 
 Underwood Street 
 Argyle Lane
 Dalgety Terrace
 Ferry Lane
 High Lane
 Lance Lane
 Roden's Lane
 Windmill Steps
 Abercrombie Lane
 Blue Anchor Lane
 Bridge Lane
 Bulletin Place
 Crane Place
 Curtin Place
 Customs House Lane
 Dalley Street
 DeMestre Place
 Empire Lane 
 Hamilton Street
 Little Hunter Street
 Loftus Lane
 Margaret Lane
 Reiby Place
 Underwood Lane
 Mooreore Stairs
 Clarence Lane
 Gas Lane
 Sussex Lane
 James Lane
 Newton Lane
 Mark Lane
 Barrack Lane
 Manning Lane
 Rawson Lane
 Hosking Place
 State Theatre Laneway
 Hargrave Lane
 Market Row
 Douglas Lane
 Foy Lane
 Nithsdale Lane
 Wright Lane
 Bijou Lane
 Dungate Lane 
 Foster Lane 
 Goulburn Lane 
 Hands Lane
 Parker Lane
 Beattie Lane
 Beauchamp Lane

Gallery

Suburbia

The suburban areas generally feature fenced or walled lanes that are "cut-through" residential lots, whereby granting pedestrians easy access to nearby facilities including shops, public transport, parks and other areas of interest situated on other roads. These passageways are more often present at the end of cul-de-sacs, where they would lead to a main road. They may feature a nature strip, though others may be completely paved. They are usually secured by bollards to prevent vehicle access, although cycling is permitted. They bear a resemblance to ginnels found in Northern England as they are a gap between houses. 

In commercial areas of suburban Sydney, several back lanes exist to simultaneously offer carparking for proximate businesses and as well as pedestrian routes as a means of shortcut.

See also
Lanes and arcades of Melbourne
Lanes of Perth, Western Australia

References

External links
HIDDEN SYDNEY’S LITTLE LANEWAYS

Streets in Sydney
Landmarks in Sydney